Mohamed Hassan bin Osman (born 21 July 1948) is a Malaysian sprinter. He competed in the men's 4 × 400 metres relay at the 1972 Summer Olympics.

References

1948 births
Living people
Athletes (track and field) at the 1972 Summer Olympics
Malaysian male sprinters
Olympic athletes of Malaysia
Place of birth missing (living people)
Asian Games medalists in athletics (track and field)
Asian Games bronze medalists for Malaysia
Athletes (track and field) at the 1966 Asian Games
Athletes (track and field) at the 1970 Asian Games
Medalists at the 1970 Asian Games